Shooting competitions at the 2007 Pan American Games in Rio de Janeiro were held in July 2007 at the Deodoro Military Club.

Medal table

Results

Men's events

Women's events

References

P
2007
Events at the 2007 Pan American Games
Shooting competitions in Brazil